Parkhead is a suburb of the Scottish city of Glasgow.

Elsewhere in the United Kingdom places named Park Head or Parkhead are:
Parkhead, Aberdeenshire, Scotland
Parkhead, Cumbria, England
Parkhead, Edinburgh, Scotland
Parkhead, Sheffield, England
Park Head, Cornwall, England
Park Head, Derbyshire, England
Park Head, Kirklees, England
Park Head, Cornwall
Park Head, Cumbria
Park Head, Derbyshire
Park Head, Kirklees

See also
Celtic Park, often referred to as "Parkhead"
Parkhead Viaduct in Dudley, West Midlands